Tikamgarh Lok Sabha constituency is one of the 29 Lok Sabha (parliamentary) constituencies in Madhya Pradesh state in central India. This constituency came into existence in 2008 as a part of the implementation of the delimitation of parliamentary constituencies. It is reserved for the candidates belonging to the Scheduled castes

This constituency covers the entire Tikamgarh district and part of Chhatarpur district. Before delimitation, Tikamgarh, Jatara, Niwari, Khargapur, Maharajpur, Chhatarpur and Bijawar Vidhan Sabha segments were part of the erstwhile Khajuraho Lok Sabha constituency.
As per census Tikamgarh District has a population of 1,445,166 in 2011 out of which 760,355 are male and 684,811 are female. Population of Tikamgarh District in 2020/2021 is 1,616,201(estimates as per aadhar uidai.gov.in feb 2019 data). Literate people are 747,940 out of 459,353 are male and 288,587 are female. People living in Tikamgarh District depend on multiple skills, total workers are 655,318 out of which men are 402,776 and women are 252,542. Total 251,049 Cultivators are depended on agriculture farming out of 187,192 are cultivated by men and 63,857 are women. 126,209 people works in agricultural land as labor, men are 75,717 and 50,492 are women. Tikamgarh District sex ratio is 901 females per 1000 of males. Next Tikamgarh District Census will be in 2021.

Assembly segments
Tikamgarh Lok Sabha constituency comprises eight Vidhan Sabha (Legislative Assembly) segments. These are:

Members of Parliament

Election results

General Elections 2019

General Elections 2014

General Elections 2009

See also
 Khajuraho (Lok Sabha constituency)
 Tikamgarh district
 List of Constituencies of the Lok Sabha

Notes

External links
Tikamgarh lok sabha  constituency election 2019 result details

Lok Sabha constituencies in Madhya Pradesh
Chhatarpur district
Tikamgarh district